The English football champions are the winners of the highest league in English men's football, which since 1992–93 is the Premier League.

Following the codification of professional football by the Football Association in 1885, the Football League was established in 1888, after meetings initiated by Aston Villa director William McGregor. At the end of the 1888–89 season, Preston North End were the first club to be crowned champions after completing their fixtures unbeaten.

The league's early years were dominated by teams from the North and Midlands, where professionalism had been embraced more readily than in the South of England. Its status as the country's pre-eminent league was strengthened in 1892, when the rival Football Alliance was absorbed into the Football League. Former Alliance clubs comprised the bulk of a new Second Division, from which promotion to the top level could be gained. It was not until 1931 that a Southern club were crowned champions, when Herbert Chapman's Arsenal secured the title.

Rules stipulating a maximum wage for players were abolished in 1961. This resulted in a shift of power towards bigger clubs. Financial considerations became an even bigger influence from 1992, when the teams then in the First Division defected to form the FA Premier League. This supplanted the Football League First Division as the highest level of football in England, and due to a series of progressively larger television contracts, put unprecedented wealth into the hands of top flight clubs. The first five champions in the Premier League era – Arsenal, Blackburn Rovers, Chelsea, Manchester City and Manchester United – had all won the title at least once prior to 1992. Leicester City were champions for the first time in 2016, becoming the first team to win the Premier League without having previously won the First Division.

All the clubs which have ever been champions are still in existence today and all take part in the top four tiers of the English football league system. Sheffield Wednesday are the only club who have ever changed their name after winning a league title having been known as The Wednesday for the first three of their four titles.

Manchester United have won twenty titles, the most of any club. United's rivals Liverpool are second with nineteen. Liverpool dominated during the 1970s and 1980s (winning eleven league titles between 1973 and 1990), while Manchester United dominated in the 1990s and 2000s under manager Sir Alex Ferguson (eleven league titles between 1993
and 2009). Arsenal are third with thirteen titles, having dominated during the 1930s (five league titles between 1931 and 1938). Everton are fourth with nine titles. Manchester City are fifth with eight titles, six of which have been won in the 2010s and 2020s. Aston Villa (seven) and Sunderland (six) secured the majority of their titles before World War I. Chelsea (six) won the majority of their titles in the 21st century (between 2005 and 2017).

Huddersfield Town (1923–24 to 1925–26), Arsenal (1932–33 to 1934–35), Liverpool (1981–82 to 1983–84) and Manchester United (1998–99 to 2000–01 and 2006–07 to 2008–09) are the only sides to have won the league title in three consecutive seasons.

List of champions

Football League (1888–1892)

Football League First Division (1892–1992)

Premier League (1992–present)

Total titles won
There are 24 clubs who have won the English title, including 7 who have won the Premier League (1992–present). The most recent to join the list were Leicester City (2015–2016 champions) and before that, Nottingham Forest (1977–1978) and Derby County (1971–1972).

Seven teams have at some point held first or joint first place in the number of titles won: Preston North End (1889–1895), Sunderland (1893–1899 and 1936–1953), Aston Villa (1897–1953), Arsenal (1948–1976), Liverpool (1966–1971 and 1973–2011), Manchester United (1967–1971 and 2009–) and Everton (1970–1971).

Eight teams have finished as runners up without ever finishing top: Bristol City (1906–1907), Oldham Athletic (1914–1915), Cardiff City (1923–1924), Charlton Athletic (1936–1937), Blackpool (1955–1956), Queens Park Rangers (1975–1976), Watford (1982–1983) and Southampton (1983–1984). Of these, Cardiff City came closest to winning the league, matching champions Huddersfield Town in points but losing out on goal average (goals scored divided by goals conceded), the precursor to goal difference.

Teams in bold compete in the Premier League as of the 2022–23 season.

By region

By city/town

English football champions map

See also
 English football first tier top scorers
 List of association football competitions
 List of First Division and Premier League winning managers
 List of Premier League winning players
 List of football clubs in England by competitive honours won
 List of FA Cup finals
 List of FA Community Shield matches
 List of English women's football champions

Notes

References
General
 
 
 

Specific

English football champions
English Football League
Lists of British award winners
England
Champions
Champions